Secondary Highway 519, commonly referred to as Highway 519, is a provincially maintained highway in the Canadian province of Ontario. A private logging road continues east from that point.

Highway 519 was assumed in 1985, and has remained unchanged since then. The route is paved throughout its length and encounters no communities of any size along its length, aside from Dubreuilville. A previous iteration of Highway 519 existed in Haliburton County between 1956 and 1984, travelling from north of Kinmount to north of Haliburton Village.

Route description 
Highway 519 is a short paved highway in the northern section of Algoma District which provides access to the remote village of Dubreuilville. From there it travels  eastward through a hilly and heavily forested region. The highway ends at Green Lake Road, just before entering Dubreuilville, a village built to service the Dubreuil Brothers lumber operations in the surrounding boreal forest. An access road continues east of the village to the Chapleau Crown Game Preserve, the largest game preserve in the world.

History 
Highway 519 was designated in 1985.
The highway has remained the same since it was designated, and was unaffected by highway downloading in the late-1990s.

Major intersections

References 

519